The Campuses of Hult International Business School, a private business school, are located in Boston, London, San Francisco, Dubai, New York City, and Shanghai.

Programs
Hult maintains offers its undergraduate programs at three campuses (in London, Boston, and San Francisco).

Hult's different postgraduate programs are offered at all of its 8 campuses. Hult's Ashridge Executive Education is housed in the Ashridge Estate, in England.

Campuses

References

External links

Hult International Business School - Campus Locations

Hult International Business School
Hult
Hult
Hult
Hult